Vaimalama Chaves (born 3 December 1994) is a French singer, beauty pageant titleholder, and model who was crowned Miss France 2019. Chaves had previously won Miss Tahiti 2018 and became the fourth representative from French Polynesia to win the Miss France title. 

During her reign as Miss France, Chaves began a music career under the mononym Vaimalama, releasing her debut single "Jardin d'hiver" in November 2019. Her debut studio album Good Vaïbes was released in February 2020.

Early life and education
Chaves was born on 3 December 1994 in Mahina on the island of Tahiti in French Polynesia. Her father works in telecommunications at the Office of Posts and Telecommunications of French Polynesia, while her mother is a nurse. Her maternal grandfather was Wallisian, while she also has Irish and Portuguese origins through her father. Chaves is the second of five children, and is the cousin of Mareva Georges, who had been crowned Miss France 1991. As a teenager, Chaves was overweight and was bullied immensely throughout her youth for her weight. 

Chaves received her baccalauréat in communications, and later received a BTS in negotiation and customer relations, a bachelor's degree in managerial economics, and a master's degree in management from the University of French Polynesia in 2017. Prior to winning Miss Tahiti, Chaves worked as a community manager at a gym.

Pageantry

Miss Tahiti 2018
Chaves began her pageantry career competing in Miss Tahiti 2018. She went on to win the competition on 22 June 2018 in Papeete and was crowned by outgoing titleholder Turouru Temorere. As Miss Tahiti 2018, Chaves earned the right to represent French Polynesia at the Miss France 2019 competition held in Lille.

Miss France 2019
Preparations for Miss France began in November 2018, with Chaves traveling to Paris for pre-pageant activities, Mauritius for the pageant's overseas trip, and then to Lille to begin rehearsals.

The finals were held on 15 December 2018, at the Zénith de Lille. Chaves advanced from the thirty contestants to the top twelve, later also advancing to the top five. She went on to be crowned Miss France 2019 by outgoing titleholder Maëva Coucke, with her first runner-up being Ophély Mézino of Guadeloupe. Chaves was the first Tahitian representative to be crowned Miss France in twenty years, after Mareva Galanter was crowned Miss France 1999, and only the fourth Tahitian crowned ever. Following her win, Chaves became a knight of the Order of Tahiti Nui, one of the highest civilian honors in French Polynesia.

On 25 June 2019, Chaves announced that she would not represent France at Miss World 2019 or Miss Universe 2019, as she would rather accompany the contestants of Miss France 2020 during their trip to Tahiti, which would have conflicted with preparation for the international pageants.  Her first runner-up, Ophély Mézino, was appointed as Miss World France 2019, while her predecessor, Maëva Coucke, was appointed to represent France at Miss Universe 2019. She completed her reign on 14 December 2019, after crowning Clémence Botino as her successor during Miss France 2020.

Post-pageantry

Music career
In November 2019, Chaves began a music career, performing under the mononym Vaimalama. She released a cover of the song "Jardin d'hiver", written by Benjamin Biolay and Keren Ann and originally performed by Henri Salvador. An official music video for the cover was released via Chaves's YouTube channel on 13 November. Her debut studio album Good Vaïbes was originally set for release in February 2020, but after several postponements, partially due to the COVID-19 pandemic, the album was released in December 2020.

Television
In September 2021, Chaves was confirmed as a celebrity contestant in season 11 of Danse avec les stars, the French version of Dancing with the Stars. Chaves was partnered with Christian Millette during the competition. They were the fifth duo to be eliminated, during the 15 October 2021 episode.

Discography

Albums

Singles

References

External links

1994 births
21st-century French women singers
French beauty pageant winners
French Polynesian beauty pageant winners
French female models
French women pop singers
French people of Irish descent
French people of Wallis and Futuna descent
French Polynesian people of Irish descent
French Polynesian people of Portuguese descent
Living people
Miss France winners
People from Tahiti
Spanish-language singers of France
Tahitian women singers
University of French Polynesia alumni
Recipients of the Order of Tahiti Nui